
Gmina Kurów is a rural gmina (administrative district) in Puławy County, Lublin Voivodeship, in eastern Poland.

Neighbouring gminas
Gmina Kurów is bordered by the gminas of Abramów, Końskowola, Markuszów, Nałęczów, Wąwolnica and Żyrzyn.

Villages in the gmina
 Barlogi
 Bronislawka
 Brzozowa Gac
 Buchalowice
 Choszczów
 Deba
 Góry Olesińskie
 Kalinówka
 Klementowice
 Kloda
 Kolonia Buchalowice
 Kolonia Klementowice
 Kolonia Nowy Dwór
 Kolonia Plonki
 Kurów
 Lakoc
 Mala Deba
 Mala Kloda
 Marianka
 Olesin
 Paluchów
 Plonki
 Podbórz
 Posiolek
 Szumów
 Wegielnica
 Wólka Nowodworska
 Wygoda
 Zastawie

Rivers

Kurówka
Bielkowa
Struga Kurów
Struga Wodna

References

Polish official population figures 2006

Kurow
Puławy County